Patrick Henry "Adam" Wade (March 17, 1935 – July 7, 2022) was an American singer, musician, and actor. Wade was perhaps most known for his stint as the host of the CBS game show Musical Chairs (1975), making him the first Black game show host in the United States.

Biography

Early life and education
Born in Pittsburgh, Pennsylvania, United States, to Pauline Simpson and Henry Oliver Wade, Jr., Wade was raised by his grandparents. Wade grew up in the East Liberty neighborhood and attended Westinghouse High School; graduating in 1952. After high school, Wade attended Virginia State University but dropped out in his sophomore year.

Career
After working for a time as a lab assistant with Dr. Jonas Salk on the polio research team, Wade began to pursue a recording career, signing with Coed Records in late 1959. He had his first hit in early 1960 (No. 58) with the song "Ruby", a cover of the hit movie song of 1953.

Wade was popular in the early-1960s. In 1961 three of his recordings ("Take Good Care of Her" (No. 7), "As If I Didn't Know" (No. 10) and "The Writing on the Wall" (No. 5) made the Top Ten in the Billboard Hot 100 chart. These songs also made the Top Five of [[Adult Contemporary (chart)|Billboard'''s Easy Listening]] survey. Wade released the following albums in the United Kingdom: Adam and Evening in 1961 and Adam Wade One Is A Lonely Number in 1962. Wade also released an EP in 1960, And Then Came Adam.
"Take Good Care of Her" reached No. 38 in the UK Singles Chart in June 1961. Wade's vocal style was generally compared to that of his contemporary Johnny Mathis. But it was actually a singer from an earlier period, Nat King Cole, who was his principal influence. In a Connecticut Public Radio interview, Wade said: "My father introduced me to Nat’s music when I was a kid. He was my idol since high school."

In 1975, Wade became the first African-American to host a television game show, with the premiere of Musical Chairs. He starred in a stage production of Guys and Dolls in 1978, and hosted the talk show Mid-Morning LA. In 1979, he co-starred with Della Reese in a production of Same Time, Next Year. On TV he was seen in the soap operas The Guiding Light and Search for Tomorrow, and was a familiar presence on such popular black-oriented sitcoms as Sanford & Son, The Jeffersons, What's Happening!! and Good Times. His handsome face lit up the room and allowed his natural mannerism to take over the scene. In the late–1970s and early–1980s Wade began to concentrate on acting, and appeared in several of the so-called blaxploitation movies, including Gordon's War.

Wade briefly returned to recording, producing a self–titled album on the Kirschner record label, which was distributed by Columbia Records. This was a venture into a more soulful singing genre. It met with moderate success but is still a favorite with his loyal fans. He appeared in one episode of The Dukes of Hazzard. His latest theatrical appearance was with the 2008 touring company of the play  The Color Purple. Wade and his wife have a music production firm, Songbird, whose headquarters are in New Jersey.

Death
A resident of Montclair, New Jersey following his marriage in 1989, Wade died there on July 7, 2022, at age 87. He had battled Parkinson’s disease.

Personal life
 
Wade was married twice and had three children. Wade's first marriage was to his high school sweetheart Kay A. Wade from 1956 until 1973. Together, they had three children; Sheldon (Ramel) Wade, Patrice Johnson Wade and Michael (Jamel) Wade. Wade was married to Jeree Wade  in 1989, and their marriage lasted until his death. The two often performed together, and Wade revealed in an interview that he met Jeree on the set of Musical Chairs.

Discography
Albums
 And Then Came Adam (Coed, 1960)
 Adam and Evening (Coed, 1961)
 Adam Wade's Greatest Hits (Epic, 1962)
 One Is a Lonely Number (Epic, 1962)
 What Kind of Fool Am I? (Epic, 1963)
 A Very Good Year for Girls (Epic, 1963)
 Adam Wade'' (Kirshner, 1977)

Singles

References

External links

 
Artist Direct
Oldies.com

1935 births
2022 deaths
African-American male actors
African-American game show hosts
American male television actors
American male stage actors
American male film actors
Deaths from Parkinson's disease 
Neurological disease deaths in New Jersey
Musicians from Pittsburgh
Male actors from Pittsburgh
People from Montclair, New Jersey
Virginia State University alumni
Coed Records artists
Epic Records artists
Singers from Pennsylvania
20th-century American drummers
American male drummers
20th-century African-American male singers